Trupanea polyclona is a species of tephritid or fruit flies in the genus Trupanea of the family Tephritidae.

Distribution
Cuba.

References

Tephritinae
Insects described in 1873
Diptera of North America